Kèrè is a town and arrondissement in the Collines department of Benin. It is an administrative division under the jurisdiction of the commune of Dassa-Zoumé. According to the population census conducted by the Institut National de la Statistique Benin on February 15, 2002, the arrondissement had a total population of 7,841.

References

Populated places in the Collines Department
Arrondissements of Benin